The C Word is a 2016 documentary film about the effort to prevent cancer, particularly the research of Dr. David Servan-Schreiber, and addresses the failure of Western medicine's approach to cancer.

Produced and directed by cancer survivor Meghan L. O'Hara, it is narrated by Morgan Freeman.

Synopsis
The director began making the film after surviving Stage 3 breast cancer.

The film identifies four factors to reduce the risk of cancer— diet, exercise, stress management, and toxin avoidance.

Cast

Release

Critical response
In a review for Spirituality & Health, Bilge Ebiri called The C Word a "well-produced documentary" and "a compassionate, touching film."

References

External links

2016 films
2016 documentary films
American documentary films
Films set in the United States
Films shot in the United States
Documentary films about cancer
2010s English-language films
2010s American films